Fitria "Fifi" Yusuf (born 9 December 1982) is an Indonesian socialite and fashion model.

Life and career 
Yusuf was born in Jakarta, Indonesia on December 9, 1982. She moved to Australia as a child and attended St Hilda's Anglican School for Girls in Perth. She graduated from Menlo College in 2001 with a bachelor's degree in business administration, majoring in Marketing from GS Fame Institute of Business in Jakarta. Fitria’s aptitude for fashion began in her childhood. She had worked as an editor for a number of fashion magazines in Jakarta, as well as a columnist of Eve magazine, before opening her own one-stop shopping boutique called Ivy boutique in 2006. She also co-founded Twinkle-Twinkle in 2009, a company producing customized crystal casings for smartphones.

Writings 
In 2009, Fitria Yusuf co-authored Little Pink Book: Jakarta Style & Shopping Guide with her friend Alexandra Dewi. In 2011, Fitria co-authored another fashion-themed book called Hermes Temptation. The 400-page book tells the story of a million-dollar resell business of French luxury-bags brand Hermès which became "a must-have item" among the high society in Jakarta. The book became a national best-seller and had been printed in Indonesia and in the United States.

Corporate career 
In 2009, Fitria was appointed as a commissioner of PT Mitra International Resources TBL, a mining services company and worked there until 2011. From 2012 to 2013, she served as the Editor In Chief of Aesthetic Beauty Guide Indonesia and Chief Executive Officer of PT Fifefa International Jakarta from 2011 onwards. In 2014, she joined property and food & beverage business, Ozone Hotel & Eatery, in Pantai Indah Kapuk, North Jakarta. She became Vice President Director of PT Citra Marga Nusaphala Persada Tbk. (CMNP)in October 2015. Previously, she served as independent commissioner at the toll road construction management company. She is currently involved in a CSR program conducted CMNP and enforcement efforts under the expressway, as well as the provision of green open space.

Yusuf was a speaker at Ideafest at Jakarta Convention Center (2016), and appeared at Jakarta Fashion Week in 2009.

Awards and recognition 
Fitria has been recognized by various media and company as a fashion icon including Tatler magazine, Senayan City, Kuningan City, Johnny Andrean Salon, and HighEnd magazine.

References 

1982 births
Living people
People from Jakarta
Indonesian female models
Indonesian writers
Indonesian businesspeople
Indonesian women in business
Indonesian Muslims
Indonesian people of Chinese descent
Menlo College alumni
Indonesian expatriates in Australia